The Carnforth War Memorial was erected on 9 November 1924, to commemorate soldiers from Carnforth who died during and after World War I.

Design 
The memorial is located on Market St, Carnforth, in a small memorial garden, and comprises a square granite plinth upon which stands a bronze figure of a soldier, standing at ease and with rifle. In addition to the bronze figure there are three inscribed plaques.  The first commemorates the Carnforth soldiers who died during World War I, the second commemorates the Carnforth soldiers who died whilst still in service between 1918 and 1924 while the third plaque commemorates the Carnforth soldiers who died during and after World War II.

A total of seventy seven names are inscribed on the memorial, fifty seven of which are recorded as killed during or as a consequence of wounds suffered during World War I, and twenty names are recorded as killed during or as a consequence of wounds suffered during World War II.

The inscription is:
TO THE HONOURED MEMORY / OF THE MEN OF / CARNFORTH / WHO DIED AFTER THE CLOSE / OF THE 1939–1945 WAR / FROM THE EFFECTS OF / WAR SERVICE

Recent history 
A silent black and white film of the unveiling of the Carnforth's War Memorial in 1924 is available on DVD from North West Film Archive, due to a donation of the film to the King's Own Royal Regiment Museum in Lancaster in 2004.  The process of converting the film to DVD was delicate as the film is "highly volatile nitrate film". The 6 minute film, which records the event attended by dignitaries, servicemen and families, was produced by the Carnforth 'Kinema' owner, William J. Weeks.

References

External links

 Kings Own Royal Regiment Museum – Images of unveiling in 1924
 Lancaster Military Heritage Group

British military memorials and cemeteries
World War I memorials in England
World War II memorials in England
Buildings and structures in the City of Lancaster
Monuments and memorials in Lancashire
Carnforth